Stig Persson (28 November 1934 – 1 July 1968) was a Swedish wrestler. He competed in the men's Greco-Roman middleweight at the 1964 Summer Olympics.

References

External links
 

1934 births
1968 deaths
Swedish male sport wrestlers
Olympic wrestlers of Sweden
Wrestlers at the 1964 Summer Olympics
People from Klippan Municipality
Sportspeople from Skåne County
20th-century Swedish people